Muratayak, also Asat or Yagomi, is one of the Finisterre languages of Papua New Guinea. It is spoken in Yagomi village of Rai Coast Rural LLG, Madang Province.

References

Finisterre languages
Languages of Madang Province